Novotroyenka is a rural locality (a selo) in Novokalmansky Selsoviet, Ust-Kalmansky District, Altai Krai, Russia. The population was 42 as of 2013. There are 3 streets.

Geography 
Novotroyenka is located 34 km south of Ust-Kalmanka (the district's administrative centre) by road. Novokalmanka is the nearest rural locality.

References 

Rural localities in Ust-Kalmansky District